Fenton Lee Bland Jr. (born March 7, 1962) is an American mortician and former Democratic member of the Virginia House of Delegates. Successful in his first bid for office in 2001, he was subsequently reelected.

But he resigned in 2005 after pleading guilty to the crime of conspiracy to commit bank fraud which included bilking an elderly man of property and committing forgery to do so. He was released from Federal Correctional Institution, Cumberland after serving 20 months of a 57-month sentence.

References

External links
 

1962 births
Democratic Party members of the Virginia House of Delegates
Virginia State University alumni
Politicians from Petersburg, Virginia
21st-century American politicians
Virginia politicians convicted of crimes
Living people